Maggie Ewen (born Magdalyn Ewen, September 23, 1994) is an American shot putter. Maggie Ewen earned bronze medal when she threw the discus  in Toronto at 2018 NACAC Championships, placed fourth in the shot put at 2019 World Athletics Championships and competed in the women's hammer throw at the 2017 World Championships in Athletics. Ewen set collegiate outdoor records in shot put and hammer.

Professional
Ewen placed 3rd throwing  at 2018 Athletics World Cup.

NCAA
Maggie Ewen won Hammer title at 2017 NCAA Division I Outdoor Track and Field Championships and 2018 NCAA Division I Indoor Shot Put. Ewen is an NCAA Division I All American 13 times and Pac-12 Conference Champion seven times.

While at Arizona State, she won the Honda Sports Award as the nation's best female track and field competitor in 2018.

At the 2018 Arizona Wildcats Desert Heat Classic (April 28), Maggie Ewen launched the shot put  to top Raven Saunders' record that stood for two years. A strong day in the field, several personal bests and a Maggie Ewen Collegiate record highlighted the competition for the Arizona State University Track and Field team at the Desert Heat Invitational on Saturday.

Her seven Pac-12 career titles are tied for the most by a woman with three others, including three-time NCAA shot put champion Dawn Dumble, Erica McLain and Gail Devers. She is a two-time winner of Pac-12 women's field Athlete of the Year.

Minnesota State High School League
Maggie Ewen a 2013 graduate of Saint Francis High School (Saint Francis, Minnesota). Ewen threw the  shot put  to win 2013 state title Minnesota State High School League. Ewen won 2013 USA Junior Discus title and silver medal from 2013 Pan American Junior Athletics Championships in the discus.

References

External links
 
 Magdalyn Ewen 2018 Arizona State University Track & Field Roster Profile
 
 Magdalyn Ewen Arizona State University Track & Field Results Athletic.net
 Magdalyn Ewen St Francis High School Track & Field Results Athletic.net

1994 births
Living people
American female hammer throwers
World Athletics Championships athletes for the United States
Track and field athletes from Minnesota
Track and field athletes from Arizona
Arizona State Sun Devils women's track and field athletes
People from St. Francis, Minnesota
USA Outdoor Track and Field Championships winners
American female shot putters
Diamond League winners
21st-century American women